Diego Martín Guidi Pierani (born 17 February 1981) is an Argentine-Chilean retired footballer.

Honours

Club
Cobreloa
 Primera División de Chile (1): 2004 Apertura

External links

1981 births
Living people
Argentine footballers
Argentine expatriate footballers
Argentina international footballers
Argentine Primera División players
Chilean Primera División players
Primera B de Chile players
Club de Gimnasia y Esgrima La Plata footballers
Universidad de Concepción footballers
Cobreloa footballers
Cobresal footballers
O'Higgins F.C. footballers
Everton de Viña del Mar footballers
Deportes La Serena footballers
Deportes Iberia footballers
Expatriate footballers in Chile
Association football central defenders
Naturalized citizens of Chile